F62 may refer to:
 Farman F.62, a French aircraft
 Hayfork Airport, in Trinity County, California
 , a Blackwood-class frigate of the Royal Navy
 Samsung Galaxy F62, a smartphone